The following highways are numbered 567:

United States

Other places